John William Ritchie (26 March 1808 – 13 or 18 December 1890) was a Canadian lawyer and politician from Annapolis Royal, Nova Scotia who is one of the Fathers of Confederation.  Ritchie was the son of Thomas Ritchie and Elizabeth Wildman Johnston. He studied law with his uncle James William Johnston and was admitted to the bar in 1831. Appointed to the Nova Scotia legislative council as Solicitor General in 1864, he was a delegate to the London Conference on Canadian Confederation and as such is considered one of the Fathers of Confederation. Appointed to the Senate of Canada in 1867, he was a judge of the Supreme Court of Nova Scotia from 1873 to 1882.  His younger brother, William Johnstone Ritchie, was Chief Justice of Canada. His daughter was Eliza Ritchie.

Ritchie died at his estate in the Northwest Arm of Halifax and is buried at St. John's Cemetery.

Gallery

References 

1808 births
1890 deaths
Canadian senators from Nova Scotia
Canadian people of British descent
Fathers of Confederation
Conservative Party of Canada (1867–1942) senators
People from Annapolis County, Nova Scotia
Colony of Nova Scotia people
Persons of National Historic Significance (Canada)
Members of the Legislative Council of Nova Scotia
Judges in Nova Scotia